Zois is a surname and masculine given name which may refer to:

 Antonios Zois (1869–1941), Greek chieftain
 Chris Zois, American psychiatrist and author
 Christos Zois (born 1968), Greek politician
 Karl von Zois (1756–1799), Carniolan amateur botanist and plant collector
 Peter Zoïs (born 1978), Australian soccer manager and retired player
 Sigmund Zois (1747–1819), Carniolan nobleman, natural scientist and patron of the arts
 Zois Ballas (born 1987), Greek basketball player
 Zois Karampelas (born 2001), Greek basketball player
 Zois Panagiotopoulos, birth name of Joe Panos (born 1971), American former National Football League player
 Zois (mythology), a martyr in wendish mythology

See also
 Zois Mansion, Ljubljana, Slovenia
 Zois Lodge at Kokra Saddle, Slovenia, a mountain hostel

Greek masculine given names